The following is a list of companies that had been, or are producing Hentai. This list only includes notable examples of companies that have received significant coverage outside of their respective works. Most of the listed entries are Japanese in origin as the term is coined from that particular country. The publication of erotic materials in the United States can be traced back to at least 1990, when IANVS Publications printed its first Anime Shower Special. 
Central Park Media's 1993 release of Urotsukidoji brought the first hentai film to American viewers.

References